As of 2019, Norway ranks 22nd in the World Economic Forum's Travel and Tourism Competitiveness Report. Tourism in Norway contributed to 4.2% of the gross domestic product as reported in 2018. Every seven in a hundred people throughout the country work in the tourism industry. Tourism is seasonal in Norway, with more than half of total tourists visiting between the months of May and August.

Attractions 
The main attractions of Norway are the varied landscapes that extend across the Arctic Circle. It is famous for its fjord-indented coastline and its mountains, ski resorts, lakes and woods. Popular tourist destinations in Norway include Oslo, Ålesund, Bergen, Stavanger, Trondheim and Tromsø. Much of the nature of Norway remains unspoiled, and thus attracts numerous hikers and skiers. The fjords, mountains and waterfalls in Western and Northern Norway attract several hundred thousand foreign tourists each year. In the cities, cultural idiosyncrasies such as the Holmenkollen ski jump attract many visitors, as well as science abilities and cultural learnings and things such as Bryggen in Bergen and the Vigeland Sculpture Park in Oslo, and they do not know about it.

The culture of Norway evolved as a result of its sparse population, harsh climate, and relative isolation from the rest of Europe. It is therefore distinct from other countries in Europe in that it has fewer opulent palaces and castles, smaller agricultural areas, and longer travel distances. Regionally distinct architecture, crafts, and art are presented in the various folk museums, typically based on an ethnological perspective. Norsk Folkemuseum at Bygdøy in Oslo is the largest of these.

Weather 
Norway is often associated with weather similar to Alaska or Siberia, primarily because the country runs along the same latitude as them. In reality, while it is often cold in Norway, the weather is often milder than expected, due to the Gulf Stream and warm air currents. The winters are typically bitterly cold with the accompaniment of snow and summers are mild with little to no humidity.

Transport 

The Norwegian highway system covers more than 90,000 kilometres, of which about 67,000 are paved. The highway system includes ferry transit across waterways, numerous bridges and tunnels, and several mountain passes. Some of these mountain passes are closed during the winter months, and some may close during winter storms. With the opening of the Oresund Bridge and the Great Belt Fixed Link, Norway is connected to the European continent by a continuous highway connection through Sweden and Denmark.

The 4,058 kilometres long rail network connects most of the major cities south of Bodø. The Norwegian rail network is also connected to the Swedish network. Oslo Airport, Gardermoen is the most important airport in Norway, with 24 million passengers in 2014. Most cities and towns have nearby airports, and some of the largest also have international flights. The cruise ferry Hurtigruten connects the cities on the coast between Bergen and Kirkenes. In the summer, the coastal cities are visited by numerous foreign cruise ships, Bergen being the main cruise port.

Arrivals by country 
In 2015, 8,828,771 foreign tourists visited Norway, an 8.3% increase over the previous year's figure of 8,154,436.

The top ten countries of origin of tourists visiting Norway were:

Most visited tourist attractions 

Innovation Norway, a state-owned promotion company which is also in charge of tourism affairs, makes annual reports on the country's most visited tourist attractions, both cultural and natural. The 2007 report lists 50 cultural and 20 natural attractions.

Tourism exhibitions 
In January 2009, the National Building Museum presented the exhibition Detour: Architecture and Design along 18 National Tourist Routes in Norway. The exhibition, which was created in collaboration with the Norwegian Embassy, was available for view until May 2009.

See also 
 National Tourist Routes in Norway
 World Heritage Sites in Norway
 Norwegian Mountain Touring Association
 List of museums in Norway
 Scandinavian Mountains Airport
 The Official Tourist Board for Northern Norway
Tourism in Denmark
Tourism in Finland
Tourism in Sweden

References

External links 

 VisitNorway.com

 
Norway